Querol is a surname. Notable people with the surname include:

Agustí Querol Subirats (1860–1909), Spanish sculptor
David Querol (born 1989), Spanish footballer 
Ferran Velazco Querol (born 1976), Spanish rugby union player
Juan Querol (born 1958), Cuban handball player
Leopoldo Querol (1899–1985), Spanish classical pianist
María Ángeles Querol (born 1948), Spanish historian, professor, and writer
Néstor Querol (born 1987), Spanish footballer
Sergio Querol (born 1965), Cuban sprinter